Geneviève Prémoy, alias Chevalier Balthazard (1660–1706), was a French officer. She made her career in the army of Louis XIV and became famous in contemporary France after her popular biography was published.

Premoy was born in Guise in Picardie. She ran away from home after a domestic conflict, dressed herself as a male and enlisted in the regiment of the Prince of Condé in 1676. She was eventually promoted and raised through the ranks through bravery in battle, and participated in the Siege of Philippsburg (1688).

Her biological sex was discovered when she was wounded during the Siege of Mons (1691). She was called to Versailles, were Louis XIV made her honorary knight of the Order of St Louis. She was fired from the army but allowed to keep her rank, and though she was ordered to wear a skirt, she continued to dress as a man on the upper part of the body.

Her autobiography, Histoire de la Dragone: contenant les actions de Genevieve Premoy, was published in 1703.

References
 Rudolf Dekker & Lotte van de Pol (1995). Kvinnor i manskläder. En avvikande tradition. Europa 1500-1800. Stockholm: Östlings Bokförlag Symposion. 
 Jessica Munns & Penny Richards: The Clothes that Wear Us: Essays on Dressing and Transgressing in Eighteenth-century culture (1999)
 John A. Lynn: The French Wars 1667-1714: The Sun King at War (2002)
 Amazons to Fighter Pilots: A-Q. Reina Pennington, Robin D. S. Higham. Greenwood Press, 1 jan 2003

1660 births
1706 deaths
Female wartime cross-dressers
17th-century LGBT people
Women in 17th-century warfare
French military personnel of the Nine Years' War
Women in war in France